Ruika Sato (born 27 March 1992) is a Japanese judoka. She competed in the women's 78 kg event at the World Judo Championships in 2013, 2014 and 2017.

In 2018, she won the gold medal in the women's 78 kg event at the 2018 Asian Games held in Jakarta, Indonesia.

References

External links
 
 

Living people
1992 births
Place of birth missing (living people)
Japanese female judoka
Judoka at the 2018 Asian Games
Asian Games gold medalists for Japan
Asian Games medalists in judo
Medalists at the 2018 Asian Games
21st-century Japanese women